Chintapalle or Chintapalli is name of places in Andhra Pradesh and Telangana:

 Chintapalle, Visakhapatnam district,  a village and mandal in Visakhapatnam district
 Chintapalli, Vizianagaram district,  a village in Vizianagaram district
 Chintapalle, Guntur district, is a village Guntur district 
 Chintapally, Nalgonda district,  a village and mandal in Nalgonda district